The Dallara F304 is an open-wheel formula racing car, designed, developed and built by Italian manufacturer Dallara, for Formula Three categories, in 2004.

References 

Dallara racing cars
Formula Three cars